Ounga may refer to:
 Ounga, Tunisia, an archaeological site in Tunisia
 Ounga, Alaska, a ghost town in Alaska, United States

See also 
 Oonga (disambiguation)
 Unga (disambiguation)